Cannon Hill railway station is located on the Cleveland line in Queensland, Australia. The station serves the Brisbane suburb of Cannon Hill. It is listed on the Brisbane Heritage Register on 30 November 2012.

On 15 July 1996, the Fisherman Islands line to the Port of Brisbane opened to the north of the station.

Services
Cannon Hill is served by Cleveland line services from Shorncliffe, Northgate, Doomben and Bowen Hills to Manly and Cleveland. Some services terminate at Platform 1: those that are part of a 15-minute service guarantee at peak hours, a system that was introduced in 2014 due to timetable remodeling commissioned by the Queensland State Government and undertaken by R.W. Singleton.

Services by platform

References

External links

Cannon Hill station Queensland's Railways on the Internet
[ Cannon Hill station] TransLink travel information

Railway stations in Brisbane
Cannon Hill, Queensland
Brisbane Local Heritage Register